Theunis Willem de Jongh  was the fifth Governor of the South African Reserve Bank. His term of office was from 1 July 1967 to 31 December 1980. He was succeeded by Gerhard de Kock.

References

Afrikaner people
Governors of the South African Reserve Bank
Living people
20th-century South African businesspeople
20th-century South African economists
Year of birth missing (living people)